The Patriotic Party (VP)  is a political party in Turkey. The Patriotic Party describes itself as "vanguard party" and its chairman, Doğu Perinçek, described the party in 2015 as a bringing together of socialists, revolutionaries, Turkish nationalists and Kemalists. The party is strongly pro-China and pro-Russia as well as anti-American.

History 
The party was founded in 1992 as Workers' Party. In 2015, after a long-time political repositioning period, the Workers' Party changed its name to "Patriotic Party" during the extraordinary congress. Like the Workers' Party, the Patriotic Party is led by Doğu Perinçek. The party's founding members include former army generals who had been pursued during the Ergenekon trials and the Sledgehammer case, though both cases have been thrown out since then.

Political positions 
The party is closely aligned with the nationalist ideology named ulusalcılık and has been described as left-wing nationalist. It officially supports Kemalism. The party also supports the ruling People's Alliance, though it is not a member. Perinçek has stated that "[r]epublicans, nationalists, populists, socialists and revolutionaries all unite in one party, the Patriotic Party". According to its charter, advocates for a "national democratic revolution", calls for "ideological independence" and organizes itself on the basis of democratic centralism.

Foreign policy 
The party is strongly pro-Russia and pro-China and anti-American because of its Eurasianist ideology. It is also strongly anti-NATO and advocates for Turkey's departure from it. It is also Eurosceptic and against Turkey's EU candidacy. The Patriotic Party supports strong relations with countries such as Iran and North Korea. It also has strong party-to-party relations with parties such as the Chinese Communist Party and the Workers' Party of Korea.

The party strongly opposes the current Turkish intervention in Syria and actively promotes better ties with the Assad government. In 2022, the party and its leader, Doğu Perinçek, openly supports Vladimir Putin and the 2022 Russian invasion of Ukraine. saying that "it is the weapon that Russia is currently using that brings peace and tranquility".

Media 
The Patriotic Party is affiliated with a number of news publications including Aydınlık, Ulusal Kanal and Bilim ve Ütopya.

Electoral performance

Notes

References

External links
 

2015 establishments in Turkey
Eurasianism
Political parties established in 2015
Political parties in Turkey
Left-wing nationalist parties